The General Obligado Department (in Spanish, Departamento General Obligado) is an administrative subdivision (departamento) of the province of Santa Fe, Argentina. It is located in the northeast of the province. Its head town is the city of Reconquista (population 66,000).

The department is located on the northeastern "corner" of Santa Fe, bordered by the Vera Department in the west and the San Javier Department in the south. In the north it limits with the province of Chaco, and in the east, with the Paraná River, which is the natural border with the province of Corrientes.

The towns and cities in this department are (in alphabetical order): Arroyo Ceibal, Avellaneda, Berna, El Arazá, El Rabón, El Sombrerito, Florencia, Guadalupe Norte, Ingeniero Chanourdie, Hardy, La Sarita, Lanteri, Las Garzas, Las Toscas, Los Laureles, Malabrigo, Nicanor E. Molinas, Reconquista, San Antonio de Obligado, Tacuarendí, Villa Ana, Villa Guillermina, Villa Ocampo.

References
 Government of the Province of Santa Fe
  Inforama] - Municipalities of the General Obligado Department.
 

Departments of Santa Fe Province